Robert Kasprzak (born 8 April 1987 in Leszno, Poland) is a former motorcycle speedway rider from Poland, who was a member of Poland U-21 national team.

Career
Kasprzak rode for Unia Leszno from 2003 to 2008. He also rode a few matches for the Isle of Wight Islanders during the 2005 Premier League speedway season.

Family
He is a son of former Polish national speedway team member Zenon Kasprzak. His brother Krzysztof (born 1984) is also a speedway rider who was a 2008 Speedway Grand Prix rider and U-21 World Champion.

Results 
 Individual U-21 World Championship
 2008 – 16th place in semi-final 1 (1 point)
 Team U-21 World Championship
 2008 – did not start in the final (14 pts in qualifying round 2)
 Individual Polish Championship
 2008 – 10th place in quarter-final 4 (6 points)
 Individual U-21 Polish Championship:
 2008 – Rybnik – 7th place (9 points)
 Team Polish Championship
 2007 – Polish Champion
 2008 – Runner-up
 Team U-21 Polish Championship
 2008 –  Leszno – Polish Champion (12 points)
 Polish Pairs U-21 Championship
 2005 – Polish Champion
 Polish Silver Helmet (U-21)
 2008 – 10th place in semi-final 1 (7 points)

See also 
 Poland national speedway team

References 

1987 births
Living people
Polish speedway riders
People from Leszno
Sportspeople from Greater Poland Voivodeship